William Smythe was an Oxford college head in the 16th-century.

Smyth was  educated at Exeter College, Oxford; and was Rector of Exeter College, Oxford, from 1519 to 1521. He held the living at St  Thomas, Salisbury. He died in 1537.

References

Alumni of Exeter College, Oxford
Rectors of Exeter College, Oxford
16th-century English people